CER ( – Digital Electronic Computer) model 202 is an early digital computer developed by Mihajlo Pupin Institute (Serbia) in the 1960s.

See also
 CER Computers
 Mihajlo Pupin Institute

One-of-a-kind computers
CER computers